We Can Make It was the only number one album in the UK for British vocal duo Peters and Lee. It spent two weeks at the top of the chart in 1973.  It is one of the very few number one albums not available on CD in the UK.

The album was produced by John Franz and the conductor was Peter Knight, Scott Walker and Dusty Springfield's old Philips team. "All change places", "I'm Confessin'" and "Let it be me" were just some of the winning songs from Opportunity Knocks in February 1973 promoted on the album. Their producer wrote "Turn to me" as a new song, and the title track "We Can Make It" was a new Brotherhood of Man B side of "Happy Ever After" submitted by Tony Hiller.

Track listing
"All Change Places" (John Garfield, David Gold)
"I'm Confessin'" (Doc Daugherty, Ellis Reynolds)
"Take To The Mountains" (Tony Hazzard)
"Turn To Me" (Bryan Blackburn, John Franz)
"There They Go" (Harold Dorman)
"We Can Make It" (Ivor Raymonde, Tony Hiller)
"Let It Be Me" (Gilbert Bécaud, Mann Curtis)
"Cryin' in the Rain" (Carole King, Howard Greenfield)
"Good Morning Freedom" (Roger Cook, Roger Greenaway, Albert Hammond, Michael Hazlewood)
"Cryin' Time" (Buck Owens)
"Never My Love" (Dick Addrisi, Don Addrisi)
"Welcome Home" (Bryan Blackburn, Jean Dupré, Stanislas Beldone)

References

1973 albums
Albums conducted by Peter Knight (composer)
Albums produced by Johnny Franz
Philips Records albums